The Christian Democratic Party is a political party in the Democratic Republic of Congo. The party won 8 out of 500 seats in the 2006 parliamentary elections. In the 19 January 2007 Senate elections, the party won 6 out of 108 seats.

Electoral history

National Assembly

See also
:Category:Christian Democratic Party (Democratic Republic of the Congo) politicians

References

2006 establishments in the Democratic Republic of the Congo
Christian democratic parties in Africa
Federalism in the Democratic Republic of the Congo
Federalist parties
Political parties established in 2006
Political parties in the Democratic Republic of the Congo